Dan Faehnle is an American guitarist from Ohio who is a member of the band Pink Martini.

He has worked with Joey DeFrancesco, Dave Frishberg, Terry Gibbs, Eddie Harris, Rebecca Kilgore, Diana Krall, Zoot Sims, Clark Terry, and Leroy Vinnegar.

Discography

As leader
 My Ideal (2001)
 Ohio Lunch (2003)

With Pink Martini
 Sympathique (Heinz, 1997)
 Hang On Little Tomato (Heinz, 2004)
 Hey Eugene! (Naive, 2007)
 Splendor in the Grass (Heinz, 2009)
 Joy to the World (Heinz, 2010)
 1969 (Heinz, 2011)
 Joy to the World Pt. 2 (Heinz, 2011)
 Joy to the World Pt. 3 (Heinz, 2012)
 Get Happy (Heinz, 2013)
 Dream a Little Dream (Heinz, 2014)
 Je Dis Oui! (Heinz, 2016)

As guest
 Dick Berk, East Coast Stroll (Reservoir, 1993)
  Dick Berk, One by One (Reservoir, 1996)
 Mel Brown, Live at Jimmy Mak's (Karmenpolicy, 1999)
 Terry Gibbs, Feelin' Good (Mack Avenue, 2005)
 Terry Gibbs, Findin' the Groove (Jazzed Media, 2006)
 Tom Grant, Lip Service (Shanachie, 1997)
 Chuck Israels, The Bellingham Sessions Volume 2 (Audio Ideas, 2000)
 Rebecca Kilgore, Not a Care in the World (Arbors, 1996)
 King Louie Organ Trio, It's About Time (Shoug, 2019)
 Ben Wolfe, Murray's Cadillac (Amosaya, 2001)

References

External links 
 Official site
 Pink Martini official site

Living people
American jazz guitarists
Pink Martini members
Guitarists from Ohio
Jazz musicians from Ohio
Year of birth missing (living people)